The Hero of the Soviet Union was the highest distinction of the Soviet Union. It was awarded 12,775 times. Due to the large size of the list, it has been broken up into multiple pages.

Recipients

 Nikolai Kabak
 Grigory Kabakovsky
 Ivan Kabalin
 Nikolai Kabalin
 Vasily Kabanov
 Vladimir Kabanov
 Yevgeny Kabanov
 Konstantin Kabanov
 Mikhail Kabanov
 Pavel Kabanov
 Igor Kaberov
 Tulen Kabilov
 Boris Kabishev
 Ivan Kabushkin ru
 Ilya Kaverin
 Andrey Kavtaskin ru
 Grigory Kagamlyk ru
 Pyotr Kagykin ru
 Sergey Kadanchik
 János Kádár
 Sergey Kadetov ru
 Anatoly Kadomtsev ru
 Mikhail Kadochkin ru
 Ivan Kadochnikov ru
 Nikolai Kadun ru
 Iosif Kaduchenko ru
 Leonid Kadyrgaliev ru
 Ochil Kadyrov
 Aleksandr Kazayev ru
 Ivan Kazayev ru
 Dmitry Kazak ru
 Ivan Kazak ru
 Daniil Kazakevich
 Pavel Kazakevich ru
 Aleksandr Afanasievich Kazakov ru
 Aleksandr Ilyich Kazakov (soldier) ru
 Aleksandr Ilyich Kazakov (pilot) ru
 Anatoly Kazakov ru
 Vasily Ivanovich Kazakov (marshal)
 Vasily Ivanovich Kazakov (sergeant) ru
 Viktor Kazakov
 Grigory Kazakov ru
 Konstantin Kazakov ru
 Mikhail Ilyich Kazakov 
 Mikhail Nikolayevich Kazakov ru
 Nikolai Yakovlevich Kazakov ru
 Pyotr Kazakov ru
 Stepan Aleksandrovich Kazakov ru
 Stepan Terentevich Kazakov ru
 Temirey Kazakov ru
 Aleksey Kazamatov ru
 Sharifzyan Kazanbaev
 Vasily Kazantsev ru
 Aleksandr Kazartsev ru
 Ashot Kazaryan ru
 Amayak Kazaryan ru
 Andranik Kazaryan ru
 Ashkharbek Kazaryan ru
 Nikolai Ivanovich Kazachenko ru
 Nikolai Mikhailovich Kazachenko ru
 Konstantin Kazachinsky ru
 Aleksey Kazachkov ru
 Marat Kazey 
 Vasily Kazimirov ru
 Salahaddin Kazimov
 Isay Kazinets ru
 Junuspey Kaipov ru
 Makhmet Kairbayev ru
 Anatoly Kaida ru
 Konstantin Kaidalov ru
 Vladimir Kaidash ru
 Vasily Kaikin ru
 Pavel Kaikov ru
 Nikita Kaimanov ru
 Ivan Kakovkin ru
 Aleksey Kalabin ru
 Valentin Kalabun ru
 Ivan Kalabushkin ru
 Dmitry Kalarash ru
 Boris Kalach ru
 Aleksandr Kalachyov ru
 Anatoly Kalachyov ru
 Vladimir Kalachyov ru
 Aleksandr Kalashnikov ru
 Anatoly Kalashnikov ru
 Ivan Kalashnikov ru
 Nikolai Kalashnikov ru
 Prokofy Kalashnikov ru
 Yakov Kalashnikov ru
 Aleksey Kalganov ru
 Ivan Kalganov ru
 Jumagali Kaldykoraev ru
 Ivan Kalendyuk ru
 Dmitry Kalenik ru
 Ivan Kalenikov ru
 Nikolai Kalyonov ru
 Ivan Kaliberda ru
 Anvar Kaliev ru
 Ivan Kalimanov ru
 Aleksandr Kalina ru
 Aleksandr Kalinin ru
 Aleksey Kalinin ru
 Boris Kalinin ru
 Vasily Kalinin ru
 Vladimir Kalinin ru
 Gavriil Kalinin ru
 Dmitry Kalinin ru
 Ivan Andreevich Kalinin ru
 Ivan Nikolaevich Kalinin ru
 Konstantin Kalinin ru
 Mikhail Mikhail Kalinin ru
 Mikhail Stepanovich Kalinin ru
 Nikolai Nikitovich Kalinin ru
 Nikolai Tikhonovich Kalinin ru
 Stepan Kalinin ru
 Tikhon Kalinin ru
 Fyodor Kalinin ru
 Nikolai Kalinich ru
 Grigory Martynovich Kalinichenko ru
 Grigory Nikolaevich Kalinichenko ru
 Semyon Kalinichenko ru
 Boris Kalinkin ru
 Mikhail Kalinkin ru
 Stepan Kalinkovsky ru
 Vasily Kalishin ru
 Aleksey Kalmykov ru
 Aleksandr Kaloev ru
 Georgy Kaloev ru
 Aleksandr Kalugin ru
 Fyodor Kalugin ru
 Grigory Kalustov ru
 Nikolai Kalutsky ru
 Leonid Kalyan ru
 Nikolai Kalyuzhny ru
 Pavel Kalyuzhny ru
 Aleksandr Kamagin ru
 Farakh Kamaldinov ru
 Galimzan Kamaleyev ru
 Nikolai Kamanin
 Mikhail Kamelchik ru
 Konstantin Kamenev ru
 Filimon Kamenev ru
 Ivan Kamennykh ru
 Vladimir Kamenshchikov ru
 Dmitry Kamzarakov ru
 Kanash Kamzin ru
 Ivan Kaminsky ru
 Pavel Kamozin (twice)
 Dmitry Kamolikov
 Kirill Kamynin ru
 Vladimir Kamyshev ru
 Ivan Kamyshev ru
 Aleksey Kanaev ru
 Aleksandr Kananadze ru
 Viktor Kanaryov ru
 Vladimir Kanareyev ru
 Aleksandr Kanarchik ru
 Pyotr Kandaurov ru
 Boris Kandybin ru
 Aleksandr Kanevsky ru
 Dmitry Kanishchev ru
 Vladimir Kankava ru
 Akhmet-khan Kankoshev ru
 Vsevolod Kansky ru
 Meliton Kantariya
 Vasily Kanunnikov ru
 Georgy Kantsev ru
 Vasily Kapitonov ru
 Lazar Kaplan ru
 Arkady Kaplunov 
 Ilya Kaplunov
 Pyotr Kapralov ru
 Dmitry Kaprin ru
 Rafael Kaprelyan
 Vladimir Kapustin ru
 Mikhail Kapustin ru
 Pyotr Kapustin ru
 Nikolai Kapustinkov ru
 Viktor Kapshuk ru
 Yelbai Karabayev ru
 Negmat Karabayev ru
 Dmitry Karaban ru
 Aleksey Karabanov ru
 Nikolai Karabulin
 Ivan Karabut ru
 Pavel Karavay ru
 Aleksandr Karaev ru
 Juman Karakulov ru
 Pyotr Karamushko ru
 Viktor Karandakov ru
 Askanaz Karapetyan ru
 Guren Karapetyan ru
 Aleksandr Karasyov
 Aleksey Karasyov ru
 Anton Karasyov ru
 Viktor Karasyov ru
 Ivan Karasyov ru
 Mikhail Karasyov ru
 Sergey Karasyov ru
 Savva Karas ru
 Afanasy Karataev ru
 Ilya Karataev ru
 Vasily Karaulov ru
 Jahan Karakhanyan ru
 Nikita Karatsupa ru
 Ivan Karacharov ru
 Mikhail Karachev ru
 Pyotr Karachev ru
 Konstantin Karachkov ru
 Vladimir Karachun ru
 Dmitry Karbyshev
 Kobard Kardanov ru
 Kubati Kardanov ru
 Murat Kardanov ru
 Yuri Kardashenko ru
 Aleksey Kardashin ru
 Anatoly Karelin
 Ivan Karelin ru
 Kostantin Karelin ru
 Pyotr Grigorievich Karelin ru
 Pyotr Petrovich Karelin ru
 Grigory Karizhsky
 Gulyam Karimov ru
 Konstantin Karitsky ru
 Sergey Karitsky ru
 Valentin Karlov ru
 Fyodor Karlov ru
 Afanasy Karmanov ru
 Ivan Karmanovsky ru
 Vladimir Karmatsky ru
 Timofey Karmatsky ru
 Dmitry Karmishin ru
 Mikhail Karnakov ru
 Vitaly Karnaukhov ru
 Mikhail Karnaushenko ru
 Stepan Karnach ru
 Nikolai Karnachyonok ru
 Aleksandr Karozin ru
 Vasily Karpachyov ru
 Mikhail Karpeev
 Akim Karpenko ru
 Vasily Karpenko ru
 Viktor Karpenko ru
 Vily Karpenko ru
 Ivan Mikhailovich Karpenko ru
 Ivan Trofimovich Karpenko ru
 Nikolai Karpenko ru
 Grigory Karpetkin ru
 Frants Karpinsky ru
 Aleksandr Alekseyevich Karpov ru
 Aleksandr Dmitrievich Karpov ru
 Aleksandr Terentevich Karpov (twice)
 Viktor Karpov ru
 Vladimir Karpov
 Grigory Karpov ru
 Ivan Petrovich Karpov ru
 Ivan Yakovlevich Karpov ru
 Mikhail Karpov ru
 Nikolai Karpov ru
 Sergey Karpov ru
 Stefan Karpov ru
 Vikenty Karpovich ru
 Viktor Karpukhin
 Mikhail Karpukhin ru
 Kazbek Karsanov ru
 Konstantin Kartashev ru
 Aleksey Kartashov ru
 Gerold Kartashov ru
 Arkady Kartoshkin ru
 Aleksandr Karushin ru
 Kuchkar Karshiev ru
 Salavat Karymov ru
 Vasily Karyakin ru
 Osman Kasayev
 Nikolai Kasatkin ru
 Vladimir Kasatonov
 Ivan Kasatonov ru
 Nikolai Kasimov ru
 Haidar Kasimov ru
 Polikarp Kasinov ru
 Leonid Kaskov ru
 Ashot Kasparov ru
 Suren Kasparyan ru
 Saidusman Kasymkhodzhaev ru
 Konstantin Kaskov ru
 Ivan Kasyan ru
 Andrey Kasyan ru
 Mikhail Kataev ru
 Gennady Katarin ru
 Nikolai Katin ru
 Ivan Katukov ru
 Fyodor Grigorievich Katukov ru
 Fyodor Leontevich Katkov ru
 Ivan Katorzhny ru
 Aleksey Katrich ru
 Mikhail Katukov (twice)
 Ilya Katunin ru
 Pyotr Katukhin ru
 Andrey Katyshev ru
 Boris Katyshev ru
 Ivan Kaulko ru
 Toganbai Kaumbaev ru
 Fyodor Kaurov ru
 Ilya Kachalin ru
 Ivan Kachalko ru
 Yevgeny Kachanov ru
 Ivan Kachanov ru
 Ivan Kachurin ru
 Vasily Kashenkov ru
 Ivan Kashin ru
 Nikolai Ivanovich Kashin (officer) ru
 Nikolai Ivanovich Kashin (sergeant) ru
 Aleksey Kashintsev ru
 Aleksandr Kashirin ru
 Aleksey Kashirin ru
 Viktor Kashirkin ru
 Pyotr Kashpurov ru
 Viktor Kashtankin ru
 Aleksey Kashtanov ru
 Vladimir Kashuba ru
 Pavel Kashuba ru
 Pavel Kashurin ru
 Prokhor Kashutin ru
 Mikhail Kashcheyev ru
 Tikhon Kashcheyev ru
 Vera Kashcheyeva
 Mikhail Kayukin ru
 Mikhail Kvasnikov ru
 Ivan Kvasov ru
 Vasiliy Kvachantiradze
 Dmitry Kvasha ru
 Aleksandr Kvashnin ru
 Ivan Kvashnin ru
 Vyacheslav Kvitinsky ru
 Aleksandr Kvitkov ru
 Dmitry Kvitovich ru
 Nikolai Kedyshko ru
 Gleb Kelbas ru
 Georgy Kelpsh ru
 Mikhail Kelchin ru
 Tule Kenzhebaev ru
 Fyodor Kerdan ru
 Tagir Karzhnyov ru
 Astan Kesaev ru
 Sergey Ketiladze ru
 Tulush Kechil-ool ru
 Aleksandr Khabarov ru
 Konstantin Khadzhiev ru
 Vladimir Khazov ru
 Nikolai Khazov ru
 Vasily Khailo ru
 Aleksandr Khalamenyuk ru
 Vasily Khalev ru
 Vasily Khalenko ru
 Aleksey Khaletsky ru
 Iosif Khalmanov ru
 Vladimir Khalo ru
 Aleksandr Khalzev ru
 Viktor Khalzov ru
 Maksim Khalyavitsky ru
 Timofey Khandoga ru
 Lev Khandrikov ru
 Pavel Khanzhin ru
 Vasily Khantaev ru
 Ivan Khaprov ru
 Georgy Kharaborkin
 Vladimir Kharaziya ru
 Yakov Khardikov ru
 Mikhail Kharin ru
 Aleksandr Kharitonov ru
 Andrey Kharitonov ru
 Vasily Dmitrievich Kharitonov ru
 Vasily Nikolayevich Kharitonov ru
 Vladimir Kharitonov ru
 Nikolai Vasilyevich Kharitonov ru
 Nikolai Nikolayevich Kharitonov ru
 Nikolai Pavlovich Kharitonov ru
 Pyotr Kharitonov ru
 Fyodor Kharitonov ru
 Aleksandr Kharitoshkin ru
 Vasily Kharitoshkin ru
 Vasily Ilyich Kharlamov ru
 Vasily Maksimovich Kharlamov ru
 Georgy Kharlamov ru
 Grigory Kharlamov ru
 Mikhail Kharlamov ru
 Nikolai Kharlamov ru
 Semyon Kharlamov
 Sergey Kharlamov ru
 Ivan Kharlan ru
 Ivan Ivanovich Kharlanov ru
 Ivan Stepanovich Kharlanov ru
 Aleksey Kharlov ru
 Fyodor Kharlov ru
 Fyodor Kharchevin ru
 Aleksandr Kharchenko ru
 Vasily Kharchenko ru
 Ivan Petrovich Kharchenko ru 
 Ivan Ustinovich Kharchenko
 Mikhail Kharchenko ru
 Pavel Kharchenko ru
 Semyon Kharchenko ru
 Stepan Kharchenko ru
 Fyodor Kharchenko ru
 Yuri Kharchenko ru
 Mikhail Karchikov ru
 Ivan Kharchin ru
 Viktor Kharchistov ru
 Anatoly Kharkovets ru
 Pyotr Kharkovsky ru
 Mansur Khasanshin ru
 Viktor Khasin ru
 Andrey Khatanzeysky ru
 Grigory Khaustov ru
 Ilya Khakherin ru
 Volf Khatskevich ru
 Georgy Khachin ru
 Mikhail Khvastantsev ru
 Mikhail Khvatkov
 Ivan Khvatov ru
 Leonid Khvorov ru
 Ilya Khvorostyanov ru
 Pavel Khvostov ru
 Andrey Khvostunov ru
 Nikita Khvoya ru
 Semyon Kheyfets ru
 Georgy Khetagurov
 Bembya Khechiev ru
 Boris Khigrin ru
 Vasily Khilchuk ru
 Andrey Khimenko ru
 Vasily Khimich ru
 Fyodor Khimich ru
 Nikolai Khimushin ru
 Stepan Khirkov ru
 Zakhar Khitalishvili ru
 Boris Khiteyev ru
 Vasily Khitrin ru
 Nikolai Khitrov ru
 Ivan Khitsenko ru
 Mikhail Khlebnikov ru
 Nikolai Khlebnikov ru
 Nikolai Khlebov ru
 Aleksey Khlobystov
 Nikolai Khloponin ru
 Boris Khlud ru
 Fyodor Khludnev ru
 Pyotr Khlyustin ru
 Ilya Khmaladze ru
 Pavel Khmelyov ru
 Arkady Khmelevsky ru
 Ivan Khmel ru
 Ivan Khovansky ru
 Roman Khovansky ru
 Dmitry Khodakov ru
 Nikolai Khodenko ru
 Irnapas Khodzhaev ru
 Saparmet Khodzhaev ru
 Konstantin Khodov ru
 Nikolai Khodosov ru
 Valentin Khodyrev ru
 Ivan Khodyrev ru
 Nikolai Khozyainov ru
 Ivan Kholobtsev ru
 Valentin Kholod ru
 Grigory Kholod ru
 Mikhail Kholod ru
 Timofey Kholod ru
 Yegor Kholodkov ru
 Georgy Kholodny ru
 Ivan Mikhailovich Kholodov ru
 Ivan Sidorovich Kholodov ru
 Georgy Kholostyakov ru
 Ivan Kholoshchak ru
 Aleksey Kholstov ru
 Aleksey Kholzunov ru
 Viktor Kholzunov ru
 Nikolai Kholyavkin ru
 Ivan Antonovich Khomenko ru
 Ivan Fedotovich Khomenko ru
 Ignat Khomenko ru
 Sergey Khomenko ru
 Nikolai Khomenkov ru
 Vladimir Khomrach ru
 Oleg Komutov ru
 Churguy-ool Khomushku
 Vladimir Khomchenovsky ru
 Vasily Khomyakov ru
 Vladilen Khomyakov ru
 Leonid Khomyakov ru
 Maksim Khomyakov ru
 Stepan Khoptyar ru
 Nikolai Khorokhonov ru
 Vladimir Khoroshilov ru
 Semyon Khoroshilov ru
 Vera Kharuzhaya
 Nikolai Khor ru
 Mikhail Khorkov ru
 Mikhail Khotimsky ru
 Vasily Khokhlachyov ru
 Anatoly Khokhlov ru
 Ivan Khokhlov ru
 Konstantin Khokhlov
 Moisey Khokhlov ru
 Nikolai Khokhlov ru
 Pyotr Vasilyevich Khokhlov ru
 Pyotr Ilyich Khokhlov ru
 Semyon Khokhryakov (twice)
 Fyodor Khokhryakov ru
 Nikolai Khramov ru
 Sergey Khramtsov ru
 Leonid Khrapov ru
 Nikolai Khrapov ru
 Pyotr Khrapov ru
 Semyon Khrebto ru
 Fyodor Khrebtov ru
 Arkady Khrenov ru
 Pyotr Khrenov ru
 Yegor Khristenko ru
 Aleksandr Khristov ru
 Ivan Khromenkov ru
 Boris Khromov ru
 Ivan Khromov ru
 Vasily Khromykh ru
 Yevgeny Khrunov
 Pavel Ivanovich Khrustalyov ru
 Pavel Pavlovich Khrustalyov ru
 Vladislav Khrustitsky ru
 Ivan Khrushchev ru
 Nikita Khrushchev
 Nikolai Khrykov ru
 Pyotr Khrychoyv ru
 Sergey Khryukin ru
 Timofey Khryukin (twice)
 Vasily Khryaev ru
 Fyodor Khudanin ru
 Nikolai Khudenko ru
 Pyotr Khudov ru
 Grigory Khudoleyev ru
 Aleksandr Khuydyakov ru
 Vasily Khuydyakov ru
 Viktor Khuydyakov ru
 Ivan Khuydyakov ru
 Nikolai Aleksandrovich Khuydyakov ru
 Nikolai Vasilyevich Khuydyakov ru
 Antonina Khudyakova
 Ivan Khurtin ru
 Anatoly Khutoryansky ru
 Mikhail Khukhlov ru
 Aleksey Khukhrin ru
 Grigory Kiba ru
 Vasily Kibalko ru
 Ivan Kibal ru
 Viktor Kibenok
 Aleksandr Kibizov ru
 Mikhail Kibkalov ru
 Aleksey Kiva ru
 Filipp Kiva ru
 Fyodor Kidalov ru
 Stepan Kidko ru
 Andrey Kizhevatov
 Zhalel Kizatov ru
 Leonid Kizim
 Andrey Kizima ru
 Vasily Kiz ru
 Pyotr Kizyun ru
 Mikhail Kikosh ru
 German Kilasoniya ru
 Porfiry Kilin ru
 Mikhail Kildyakov ru
 Yevgeny Kim
 Ivan Kineshov ru
 Khodi Kinzhaev ru
 Ivan Kindyushev ru
 Vladimir Kipenko ru
 Ivan Kipot ru
 Isakk Kirgetov ru
 Stepan Kirgizov ru
 Gavriil Kirdishchev ru
 Aleksey Kireyev ru
 Viktor Kireyev ru
 Ivan Kireyev ru
 Nikolai Kireyev ru
 Semyon Kireyev ru
 Timofey Kirenkov ru
 Ivan Kirik ru
 Vasily Kirilenko ru
 Nikolai Kirilenko ru
 Aleksandr Kirillov ru
 Veniamin Kirillov ru
 Vladimir Kirillov ru
 Mikhail Mikhailovich Kirillov ru
 Mikhail Petrovich Kirillov ru
 Mikhail Semyonovich Kirillov ru
 Nikolai Mikhailovich Kirillov ru
 Nikolai Pavlovich Kirillov ru
 Andrey Kirilyuk ru
 Viktor Kirilyuk ru
 Sergey Kirichek ru
 Aleksandr Kirichenko ru
 Aleksey Kirichenko ru
 Ivan Kirichenko ru
 Mikhail Kirichenko ru
 Pyotr Kirichenko ru
 Vasily Kirichuk ru
 Shalva Kiriya ru
 Vladimir Kirmanovich ru
 Boris Kirpikov ru
 Illarion Kirpichyov ru
 Ivan Kirpichenko ru
 Mikhail Kirponos
 Aleksandr Kirsanov ru
 Vladimir Kirsanov ru
 Ivan Kirsanov ru
 Nikolai Kirtok ru
 Vasily Kiryakov ru
 Konstantin Kiryanov ru
 Nikolai Kiryanov ru
 Pavel Kiryanov ru
 Mikhail Kiryukhin ru
 Nikolai Kiryukhin
 Aleksandr Kiselyov ru
 Afrikan Kiselyov ru
 Vasily Alekseyevich Kiselyov ru
 Vasily Iosifovich Kiselyov ru
 Vasily Nikolaevich Kiselyov ru
 Vladimir Kiselyov ru
 Gennady Kiselyov ru
 Ivan Aleksandrovich Kiselyov (artilleryman) ru
 Ivan Aleksandrovich Kiselyov (tankman) ru
 Ivan Gerasimovich Kiselyov ru
 Ivan Mikhailovich Kiselyov ru
 Nikolai Kiselyov ru
 Rafail Kiselyov ru
 Semyon Kiselyov ru
 Sergey Ivanovich Kiselyov ru
 Sergey Semyonovich Kiselyov ru
 Stepan Kiselyov ru
 Yakov Kiselyov ru
 Ivan Kiselenko ru
 Pyotr Kiselenko ru
 Aleksey Kislintsyn ru
 Pyotr Kislov ru
 Ivan Kislukhin ru
 Mariya Kislyak
 Nikolai Kislyak ru
 Anatoly Kislyakov ru
 Vasily Kislyakov ru
 Mikhail Kislyakov ru
 Anatoly Kisov ru
 Ivan Kistaev ru
 Nikolai Mikhailovich Kitaev ru
 Nikolai Trofimovich Kitaev ru
 Pavel Kitchenko ru
 Ivan Kitsenko ru
 Nikolai Kichigin ru
 Nikolai Kiyanchenko ru
 Viktor Kiyashko ru
 Grigory Kiyashko ru
 Mikhail Kiyashko ru
 Nikolai Kiyashko ru
 Viktor Kladiev ru
 Vasily Klevtsov ru
 Ivan Klevtsov ru
 Sergey Klevtsov ru
 Fyodor Kleybus ru
 Robert Klein ru
 Prokofy Klepach ru
 Goergy Klepikov ru
 Nikolai Klepikov ru
 Ivan Kleshch ru
 Aleksey Kleshchev
 Ivan Kleshchyov ru
 Ivan Klimov ru
 Alekseu Klimashkin ru
 Grigory Klimenko ru
 Ivan Klimenko ru
 Kondrat Klimenko ru
 Mikhail Klimenko ru
 Nikolai Ivanovich Klimenko ru
 Nikolai Nikolayevich Klimenko ru
 Nikolai Sergeyevich Klimenko ru
 Nikolai Fyodorovich Klimenko ru
 Pyotr Klimenko ru
 Sergey Klimenko ru
 Tikhon Klimenko ru
 Trofim Klimenko ru
 Dmitry Klimzov ru
 Vasily Klimov ru
 Vladimir Klimov ru
 Ivan Klimov ru
 Ilya Klimov ru
 Mikhail Klimov ru
 Nikolai Klimov ru
 Pavel Klimov ru
 Sergey Klimovich ru
 Nikolai Klimovsky ru
 Pyotr Klimuk
 Aleksandr Klimushkin ru
 Aleksandr Klinkovsky ru
 Igor Klinov ru
 Klim Klinovitsky ru
 Aleksey Klinovoy ru
 Yegor Klishin ru
 Vsevolod Klokov ru
 Pyotr Klokov ru
 Nikolai Klochko ru
 Vasily Klochko ru
 Vladimir Klochko ru
 Ivan Klochko ru
 Yakov Klochko ru
 Aleksandr Klubov (twice)
 Yevgeny Klumov ru
 Nikolsi Klypin ru
 Mukhamed Klychev ru
 Vasily Klyuev ru
 Pyotr Klyuev ru
 Vasily Klyukin ru
 Ivan Klyuchnik ru
 Aleksey Klyushkin ru
 Yevgeny Klyushnikov ru
 Platon Klyata ru
 Eduard Knyaginichev ru
 Aleksey Arsentevich Knyazev ru
 Aleksey Petrovich Knyazev ru
 Vasim Knyazev ru
 Vasily Knyazev ru
 Ivan Knyazev ru
 Mikhail Knyazev ru
 Nikolai Knyazev ru
 Nikolai Knyazkin ru
 Ivan Knyazkov ru
 Aleksandr Kobelev ru
 Arkady Kobelev ru
 Yermolay Koberidze ru
 Semyon Kobets ru
 Fyodor Kobets ru
 Yakov Kobzar ru
 Anatoly Kobzev ru
 Stepan Kobzev ru
 Ivan Kobzun ru
 Khamit Kobikov ru
 Aleksandr Kobisskoy ru
 Anatoly Koblikov ru
 Sergey Koblov ru
 Ivan Kobyletsky ru
 Ivan Kobylyansky ru
 Boris Kobyakov ru
 Ivan Kobyakov ru
 Aleksey Kovalyov ru
 Andrey Kovalyov ru
 Valentin Kovalyov ru
 Venedikt Kovalyov ru
 Vladimir Kovalyov ru
 Grigory Kovalyov ru
 Dmitry Kovalyov ru
 Ivan Kovalyov ru
 Konstantin Kovalyov
 Mikhail Kovalyov ru
 Nikita Kovalyov ru
 Nikolai Ivanovich Kovalyov ru
 Nikolai Kuzmich Kovalyov ru
 Nikolai Nikolayevich Kovalyov ru
 Pavel Savelevich Kovalyov ru
 Pavel Stepanovich Kovalyov ru
 Pyotr Kovalyov ru
 Stepan Kovalyov ru
 Timofey Alekseyevich Kovalyov ru
 Timofey Fyodorovich Kovalyov ru
 Filipp Kovalyov ru
 Anatoly Kovalevsky ru
 Pavel Kovalevsky ru
 Aleksandr Kovalenko ru
 Anatoly Kovalenko ru
 Boris Kovalenko ru
 Vasily Kovalenko ru
 Georgy Kovalenko ru
 Grigory Kovalenko ru
 Pavel Kovalenko ru
 Pyotr Danilovich Kovalenko ru
 Pyotr Ivanovich Kovalenko ru
 Pyotr Mikhailovich Kovalenko ru
 Sergey Kovalenko ru
 Yuri Kovalenko ru
 Vladimir Kovalyonok
 Aleksandr Koval ru
 Dmitry Koval ru
 Ivan Ivanovich Koval ru
 Ivan Nestrovich Koval ru
 Ksenofont Koval ru
 Anton Kovalsky ru
 Stalislav Kovalchuk ru
 Dmitry Kovalchuk ru
 Ivan Kovalchuk ru
 Ivan Kovanev ru
 Pyotr Kovats ru
 Arkady Kovachevich
 Dmitry Koveshnikov ru
 Boris Kovzan
 Sydir Kovpak (twice)
 Ilya Kovrizhko ru
 Fyodor Kovrov ru
 Vasily Yefimovich Kovtun ru
 Vasily Semyonovich Kovtun ru
 Grigory Kovtun ru
 Karp Kovtun ru
 Pavel Kovtun ru
 Georgy Kovtunov ru
 Dmitry Kovtyulev ru
 Ivan Kovsharov ru
 Natalya Kovshova
 Mikhail Kodochigov ru
 Vasily Kozhanov
 Nikolai Kozhanov ru
 Pyotr Kozhanov ru
 Ilya Kozhar ru
 Aliaskar Kozhebergenov ru
 Anatoly Kozhevnikov ru
 Ivan Kozhedub (thrice)
 Ivan Kozhemyakin ru
 Mikhail Kozhemyakin ru
 Pyotr Kozhemyakin ru
 Pavel Kozhin ru
 Vasily Kozhukhov ru
 Nikolai Kozhushkin ru
 Semyon Kozak (twice)
 Stepan Kozak ru
 Aleksandr Kozakov ru
 Nikolai Kozachek ru
 Aleksay Kozachenko ru
 Pyotr Kozachenko ru
 Ivan Kozachuk ru
 Vasily Kozenkov ru
 Anatoly Koziev ru
 Nestor Kozin
 Pyotr Kozinets ru
 Ivan Kozich ru
 Pyotr Kozlenko ru
 Mefody Kozlitin ru
 Aleksandr Kozlov ru
 Aleksey Kozlov ru
 Arsenty Kozlov ru
 Valentin Georgievich Kozlov ru
 Valentin Tikhonovich Kozlov ru
 Vasily Kozlov
 Viktor Dmitrievich Kozlov ru
 Viktor Mikhailovich Kozlov ru
 Vladimir Kozlov ru
 Grigory Kozlov ru
 Dmitry Markovich Kozlov ru
 Dmitry Fyodorovich Kozlov ru
 Yefim Kozlov ru
 Ivan Yegorovich Kozlov ru
 Ivan Ivanovich Kozlov ru
 Ivan Semyonovich Kozlov ru
 Iosif Kozlov ru
 Mikhail Vasilyevich Kozlov ru
 Mikhail Danilovich Kozlov ru
 Mikhail Fyodorivich Kozlov ru
 Nikita Kozlov ru
 Nikolai Aleksandrovich Kozlov (pilot) ru
 Nikolai Aleksandrovich Kozlov (tankman) ru
 Nikolai Andreyevich Kozlov ru
 Nikolai Vasilyevich Kozlov ru
 Nikolai Mikhailovich Kozlov ru
 Pavel Kozlov ru
 Pyotr Alekseyevich Kozlov ru
 Pyotr Mikhailovich Kozlov ru
 Sergey Kozlov ru
 Stepan Kozlov ru
 Fyodor Kozlov ru
 Evald Kozlov ru
 Vasily Kozlovsky ru
 Iganty Kozlovsky ru
 Nikolai Kozlovsky ru
 Boris Koznov ru
 Mikhail Kozomazov ru
 Sardion Kozonov ru
 Andrey Kozorezov ru
 Pavel Kozyrev ru
 Sergey Kozyrev ru
 Maksim Kozyr ru
 Ivan Kozmin ru
 Nikolai Dmitrievich Kozyakov ru
 Nikolai Yefimovich Kozyakov ru
 Ivan Kozyarenko ru
 Vasily Koynash ru
 Vladimir Kokkinaki (twice)
 Konstantin Kokkinaki
 Semyon Kokora ru
 Pavel Kokorev ru
 Anatoly Aleksandrovich Kokorin ru
 Anatoly Mikhailovich Kokorin ru
 Fyodor Kokorin ru
 Yason Kokoskeriya ru
 Oleg Kokushkin
 Ivan Koksharov ru
 Mikhail Kolbasa ru
 Nikolai Kolbasov ru
 Aleksandr Kolbeyev ru
 Vasily Kolbnev ru
 Vladimir Kolbunov ru
 Mikhail Koldubov ru
 Aleksandr Koldunov (twice)
 Vasily Kolennikov ru
 Boris Kolesnik ru
 Kolesnik Artyomovich Kolesnik ru
 Vasily Vasilyevich Kolesnik ru
 Vasily Stepanovich Kolesnik ru
 Vladimir Kolesnik ru
 Pave; Avtonomovich Kolesnik ru
 Pavel Antonovich Kolesnik ru
 Pyotr Kolesnik ru
 Aleksandr Kolesnikov ru
 Aleksey Kolesnikov ru
 Vasily Kolesnikov ru
 Vitaly Kolesnikov ru
 Vladimir Alekseyevich Kolesnikov ru
 Vladimir Mikhailovich Kolesnikov ru
 Grigory Kolesnikov ru
 Ivan Kolesnikov ru
 Konstantin Kolesnikov ru
 Mikhail Kolesnikov ru
 Nikolai Vasilyevich Kolesnikov ru
 Nikolai Danilovich Kolesnikov ru
 Nikolai Pavlovich Kolesnikov ru
 Pyotr Kolesnikov ru
 Pimen Kolesnikov ru
 Semyon Gavrilovich Kolesnikov ru
 Semyon Nikitovich Kolesnikov ru
 Sidor Kolesnikov ru
 Fyodor Kolesnikov ru
 Vasily Kolesnichenko ru
 Mikhail Kolesnichenko ru
 Stepan Kolesnichenko ru
 Aleksandr Andreyevich Kolesov 
 Aleksandr Mikhailovich Kolesov ru
 Yelena Kolesova
 Boris Kolessa ru
 Ivan Kolin ru
 Pyotr Kolmakov ru
 Leonid Kolobov
 Ivan Kolovanov ru
 Nikolai Kologoyda ru
 Mikhail Kologrivov ru
 Ivan Kolody ru
 Andrey Kolodin ru
 Nikolai Kolodko ru
 Aleksandr Kolodnikov ru
 Boris Kolodchenko ru
 Arsenty Kolodyazhny ru
 Pyotr Kolodyazhny ru
 Fyodor Kolokoltsev ru
 Anatoly Kolomeytsev ru
 Pyotr Ivanovich Kolomiets ru
 Pyotr Leontevich Kolomiets ru
 Ivan Kolomychenko ru
 Pyotr Kolomin ru
 Andrey Kolomoets ru
 Vasily Kolomoets ru
 Vasily Kolonov ru
 Aleksay Koloskov ru
 Pyotr Koloskov ru
 Vasily Kolosov ru
 Viktor Kolosov ru
 Mikhail Dmitrievich Kolosov ru
 Mikhail Yefimovich Kolosov ru
 Nikolai Vasilyevich Kolosov ru
 Nikolai Grigorievich Kolosov ru
 Leonid Kolotilov ru
 Vasily Koloshenko ru
 Pyotr Vasilyevich Kolpakov ru
 Pyotr Ivanovich Kolpakov ru
 Vladimir Kolpakchi
 Fyodor Koltyga ru
 Mikhail Kolchanov ru
 Nikolai Kolchev ru
 Aleksandr Kolchin ru
 Fyodor Kolykhmatov ru
 Nikolai Kolychev ru
 Oleg Kolychev ru
 Ivan Kolyshkin ru
 Aleksey Koltsov ru
 Ivan Koltsov ru
 Pavel Koltsov ru
 Nikolai Kolchak ru
 Yakov Kolchak ru
 Nikolai Kolyuzhny ru
 Vasily Kolyada ru
 Viktor Kolyadin ru
 Valentin Komagorov ru
 Konstantin Komardinkin ru
 Grigory Komaritsky ru
 Aleksandr Komarov ru
 Vasily Komarov ru
 Viktor Petrovich Komarov ru
 Viktor Stepanovich Komarov ru
 Vladimir Mikhailovich Komarov  (twice)
 Vladimir Nikolayevich Komarov ru
 Georgy Vladimirovich Komarov ru
 Georgy Osipovich Komarov ru
 Grigory Komarov ru
 Dmitry Komarov ru
 Ivan Komarov ru
 Mikhail Komarov ru
 Nikolai Komarov ru
 Sergey Komarov ru
 Georgy Komarychev ru
 Dmitry Komar ru
 Yegor Kombarov ru
 Taimbet Komekbaev
 Mikhail Komelkov
 Sergey Komendant ru
 Vadim Komendat ru
 Valentin Komissarov ru
 Pyotr Komlev ru
 Stepan Komlev ru
 Arkady Komok ru
 Anatoly Komosa ru
 Fyodor Kompanteyets ru
 Aleksey Kompaniets ru
 Stepan Konashenko ru
 Fyodor Kongalyov ru
 Vasily Konvakov ru
 Viktor Kondakov ru
 Viktor Kondakov ru
 Vladimir Kondaurov ru
 Ivan Kondaurov ru
 Yemenlyan Kondrat ru
 Ivan Kondratenko ru
 Pyotr Kondratenko ru
 Ivan Kondratets ru
 Yakov Kondratov ru
 Nikita Kondratovich ru
 Ivan Dmitrievich Kondratev ru
 Ivan Petrovich Kondratev ru
 Leonty Kondratev ru
 Pyotr Kondratev ru
 Sergey Kondratev ru
 Aleksandr Kondratyuk ru
 Aleksandr Kondrashyov ru
 Andrey Kondrashin ru
 Ivan Kondrashin ru
 Serey Kondrin ru
 Aleksey Kondrtsky ru
 Pavel Kondyra ru
 Vasily Kondyryov ru
 Aleksandr Konev ru
 Boris Konev ru
 Viktor Konev ru
 Georgy Konev ru
 Ivan Nikianorovich Konev ru
 Ivan Nikitich Konev
 Ivan Stepanovich Konev (twice)
 Mikhail Konev ru
 Pavel Konev ru
 Pyotr Alekseyevich Konev ru
 Pyotr Prokofevich Konev ru
 Mikhail Konin ru
 Ivan Konishchev ru
 Grigory Konkin ru
 Mikhail Konkin ru
 Vasily Konnov ru
 Vasily Konobaev ru
 Vladimir Konovalenko ru
 Aleksey Konovalov ru
 Alndrey Konovalov ru
 Vladimir Konovalov
 Mikhail Vasilyevich Konovalov ru
 Mikhail Semyonovich Konovalov ru
 Pavel Konovalov ru
 Semyon Konovalov ru
 Sergey Konovalov ru
 Fyodor Konovalov ru
 Ilya Konovchenko ru
 Aleksey Kononenko ru
 Vasily Kononenko ru
 Nikita Kononenko ru
 Nikolai Kononenkov ru
 Aleksandr Kononov ru
 Mikhail Kononov ru
 Nikolai Kononov ru
 Pyotr Kononykhin ru
 Vasily Konoplya ru
 Ivan Konorev ru
 Vladimir Konosh ru
 Aleksandr Konstantinov ru
 Anatoly Konstantinov
 Vladimir Konstantinov
 Garush Konstantinov ru
 Ivan Konstantinov ru
 Lavrenty Konstantinov ru
 Mikhail Petrovich Konstantinov
 Mikhail Romanovich Konstantinov ru
 Nikolai Konstantinov ru
 Kseniya Konstantinova
 Tamara Konstantinova
 Aleksey Kontushny ru
 Nazir Konukoev ru
 Zinovy Kontsevoy ru
 Nikolai Konchakov ru
 Aleksandr Konchin ru
 Nikolai Konyshev ru
 Ivan Konko ru
 Gennady Konkov ru
 Pyotr Konkov ru
 Fyodor Konkov ru
 Andrey Konshakov ru
 Sergey Konyukhov ru
 Iosif Konyusha ru
 Anatoly Konyaev ru
 Arkady Konyaev ru
 Pyotr Konyaev ru
 Aleksandr Fyodorovich Konyakhin ru
 Aleksandr Romanovich Konyakhin ru
 Vasily Konyakhin ru
 Ivan Konyakhin ru
 Maksim Konyashkin ru
 Grigory Kopaev ru
 Igor Kopeykin ru
 Ivan Kopyonkin ru
 Ivan Kopets ru
 Mikhail Koptev ru
 Grigory Koptilov ru
 Vasily Alekseyevich Koptsov
 Vasily Danilovich Kopylov ru
 Vasily Ivanovich Kopylov ru
 Ivan Andreyevich Kopylov ru
 Ivan Pavlovich Kopylov ru
 Mikhail Kopylov ru
 Nikolai Veniaminovich Kopylov ru
 Nikolai Iosifovich Kopylov ru
 Pavel Kopylov ru
 Stepan Kopylov ru
 Nikolai Kopytyonkov ru
 Mikhail Kapytin ru
 Mikhail Kopytov ru
 Stepan Kopytov ru
 Konstantin Korablyov ru
 Vladimir Korablin ru
 Pyotr Korbut ru
 Vladimir Korguzalov ru
 Vasily Korda ru
 Shika Kordonsky ru
 Vasily Kordyuchenko ru
 Aleksey Korelyakov ru
 Ivan Korenkov ru
 Feodosy Korenchuk ru
 Vasily Korenkov ru
 Vasily Korzh
 Fyodor Korzhavin ru
 Daniil Korzhov ru
 Vladimir Korzhushko ru
 Konstantin Korzov ru
 Andrey Korzun ru
 Ivan Korzunov ru
 Dmitry Korkotsenko ru
 Ivan Kormilkin ru
 Ivan Kormishin ru
 Aleksandr Aleksandrovich Kornev ru
 Aleksandr Stepanovich Kornev ru
 Vasily Kornev ru
 Grigory Kornev ru
 Ivan Ilyich Kornev ru
 Ivan Fyodorovich Kornev ru
 Leonid Kornev ru
 Afanasy Korneyev ru
 Vasily Klimovich Korneyev ru
 Vasily Terentevich Korneyev ru
 Vladimir Korneyev ru
 Georgy Korneyev ru
 Grigory Korneyev ru
 Ivan Aleksandrovich Korneyev ru
 Ivan Ilyich Korneyev ru
 Yakov Korneyev ru
 Vasily Korneyko ru
 Viktor Korner ru
 Ivan Mikheyevich Kornienko ru
 Ivan Moiseyevich Kornienko ru
 NikolaiKornienko ru
 Prokofy Kornienko ru
 Anatoly Kornilaev ru
 Boris Kornilov ru
 Mikhail Dmitrievich Kornilov ru
 Mikhail Semyonovich Kornilov ru
 Mikhail Kornitsky ru
 Vasily Kornishin ru
 Nikolai Kornyushkin ru
 Afanasy Korobeynikov ru
 Nikolai Korobeynikov ru
 Miron Korobeshko ru
 Vasily Korobkin ru
 Ivan Korobkin ru
 Dmitry Korobkov ru
 Pavel Korobkov 
 Fyodor Korobkov ru
 Aleksandr Korobov ru
 Vadim Korobov ru
 Grigory Korobov ru
 Mikhail Korobov ru
 Stepan Korobov ru
 Aleksandr Korobchuk ru
 Artyom Korovin ru
 Ilya Korovin ru
 Kesar Korovin ru
 Nikolai Korovin ru
 Yakov Korovin ru
 Nikolai Korovushkin ru
 Ivan Korogodin ru
 Aleksandr Korolyov ru
 Vasily Aleksandrovich Korolyov ru
 Vasily Ivanovich Korolyov ru
 Vitaly Korolyov ru
 Vladimir Korolyov ru
 Gerasim Korolyov ru
 Ivan Korolyov ru
 Iosif Korolyov ru
 Konstantin Korolyov ru
 Matvey Korolyov ru
 Nikolai Mikhailovich Korolyov ru
 Nikolai Stepanovich Korolyov
 Nikolai Filippovich Korolyov ru
 Pavel Korolyov ru
 Roman Korolyov ru
 Fyodor Korolyov ru
 Grigory Korolenko ru
 Ivan Vasilyevich Korolkov ru
 Ivan Ivanovich Korolkov ru
 Ivan Fyodorovich Korolkov ru
 Aleksandr Korolsky ru
 Ivan Korolyuk ru
 Aleksey Korostelyov ru
 Pavel Korostelyov ru
 Pyotr Korostelyov ru
 Konstantin Koroteyev
 Nikolai Korotky ru
 Aleksey Korotkov ru
 German Korotkov ru
 Ivan Korotkov ru
 Konstantin Korotkov ru
 Mikhail Korotkov ru
 Pyotr Korochkin ru
 Vladimir Korsakov ru
 Nikolai Korsakov ru
 Pyotr Korsakov ru
 Nikolai Korsun ru
 Volf Korsunsky ru
 Aleksey Kortunov ru
 Ivan Korunov ru
 Ivan Korchagin
 Lev Korchagin ru
 Iosif Korchak ru
 Pavel Korchmaryuk ru
 Konstantin Korshunov ru
 Pavel Korshunov ru
 Sergey Korshunovich ru
 Pyotr Koryshev ru
 Gennady Koryukin ru
 Aleksandr Koryavin ru
 Ivan Koryavko ru
 Pyotr Koryagin ru
 Disan Koryazin ru
 Aleksandr Koryakov ru
 Vasily Koryakov ru
 Ivan Koryakovsky ru
 Karp Koryachko ru
 Alikbai Kosaev ru
 Aleksandr Kosarev ru
 Andrey Kosarev ru
 Vladimir Kosarev ru
 Vladimir Kosachyov ru
 Pyotr Kosenko ru
 Yuri Kosenko ru
 Ivan Kosenkov ru
 Pyotr Kosenkov ru
 Vladimir Kosinov ru
 Semyon Kosinov ru
 Aleksandr Kositsyn ru
 Feodosy Kosmach ru
 Mikhail Kosmachyov ru
 Zoya Kosmodemyanskaya
 Aleksandr Kosmodemyansky
 Vasily Kosov ru
 Viktor Kosov ru
 Daniil Kosov ru
 Yakov Kosovichev ru
 Valentin Kosolapov ru
 Viktor Kosolapov ru
 Filipp Kosolapov ru
 Lev Kosonogov ru
 Vladimir Kosorukov ru
 Mikhail Kossa ru
 Anton Kostenko ru
 Grigoru Kostenko ru
 Mikhail Kostenko ru
 Pavel Kostenko ru
 Fyodor Kostenko ru
 Semyon Kosterin ru
 Pyotr Kostetsky ru
 Fyodor Kostikov ru
 Yuri Kostikov ru
 Aleksandr Kostin ru
 Aleksey Kostin ru
 Vaisly Kostin ru
 Viktor Kostin ru
 Ivan Dmitrievich Kostin ru
 Ivan Ivanovich Kostin ru
 Leonid Kostin ru
 Fyodor Kostin ru
 Yegor Kostitsyn ru
 Viktor Kostousov ru
 Afanasy Kostrikin ru
 Vladimir Kostrikin ru
 Sergey Kostritsky ru
 Pyotr Kostrov ru
 Stanislav Kostrov ru
 Pyotr Kostromtsov ru
 Nikolai Kostryukov ru
 Aleksandr Kostylev ru
 Georgy Kostylev ru
 Yevgeny Kostylyov ru
 Tatyana Kostyrina
 Stepan Kostychev ru
 Andrey Kostyuk ru
 Iosif Kostyuk ru
 Fyodor Kostyuk ru
 Mikhail Kostyukov ru
 Pyotr Kostyukov ru
 Pyotr Kostyuchenko ru
 Boris Kostyakov ru
 Yevgeny Kosmin ru
 Ivan Kosyak ru
 Sergey Kosyakin ru
 Mikhail Kosyakov ru
 Aleksey Kot ru
 Vasily Kot ru
 Viktor Kot ru
 Fyodor Kotanov ru
 Aleksey Kotegov ru
 Aleksandr Kotelkov ru
 Aleksey Kotelnikov ru
 Mikhail Kotelnikov ru
 Nikolai Kotelnikov ru
 Yakov Kotelnikov ru
 Valentin Kotyk
 Nikolai Kotkov ru
 Anatoly Kotkov ru
 Vasily Kotkov ru
 Nikolai Kotkov ru
 Mikhail Kotlovets ru
 Ivan Kotlyar ru
 Leonty Kotlyar ru
 Feodosy Kotlyar ru
 Boris Kotlyarsky ru
 Aleksandr Aleksandrovich Kotov ru
 Aleksandr Grigorievich Kotov ru
 Boris Kotov ru
 Vladimir Kotov ru
 Georgy Kotov ru
 Yevgeny Kotov ru
 Ivan Vasilyevich Kotov ru
 Ivan Ilyich Kotov ru
 Ivan Mikhailovich Kotov ru
 Ilya Kotov ru
 Mikhail Kotov ru
 Nikita Kotov ru
 Nikolai Kotov ru
 Sergey Kotov ru
 Yakov Kotov ru
 Aleksandr Kottsov ru
 Fyodor Kotchenko ru
 Vasily Kotyunin ru
 Sergey Kokhanovich ru
 Nikolai Kokhov ru
 Grigory Kotseba ru
 Tikhon Kotsyubinsky ru
 Yuri Kochelaevsky ru
 Pavel Kocherga ru
 Grigoru Kochergin ru
 Yegor Kochergin ru
 Fyodor Kochergin ru
 Vasily Kocherov ru
 Viktor Kocherov ru
 Aleksey Kochetkov ru
 Andrey Kochetkov ru
 Grigoru Kochetkov ru
 Mikhail Kochetkov ru
 Nikolai Pavlovich Kochetkov ru
 Nikolai Yakovlevich Kochetkov ru
 Stepan Kochetkov ru
 Aleksandr Kochetov
 Vasily Kochetov ru
 Ivan Kochetov ru
 Mikhail Kochetov ru
 Konstantin Kochiev ru
 Nikolai Kochmaryov ru
 Vladimir Kochnev ru
 Ivan Kochnev ru
 Aleksey Kochubarov ru
 Nikolai Koshaev ru
 Ali Koshev ru
 Oleg Koshevoy
 Pyotr Koshevoy (twice)
 Fyodor Koshevoy ru
 Andrey Koshelev ru
 Vasily Koshelev ru
 Vladimir Koshelev ru
 Ivan Koshelev ru
 Mikhail Koshelev ru
 Nikolai Vasilyevich Koshelev ru
 Nikolai Ivanovich Koshelev ru
 Pyotr Koshelev ru
 Stepan Koshel ru
 Fyodor Koshel ru
 Boris Koshechkin ru
 Grigoru Koshkarov ru
 Aleksey Koshkin ru
 Andrey Koshkin ru
 Kirill Koshman ru
 Mikhail Koshmanov ru
 Georgy Koshmyak ru
 Veniamin Koshukov ru
 Pavel Koshcheyev ru
 Lyudmila Kravets
 Mikhail Kravets ru
 Mordukh Kravets ru
 Pyotr Kravets ru
 Aleksey Kravtsov ru
 Boris Kravtsov
 Grigory Kravtsov ru
 Dmitry Kravtsov ru
 Yefim Kravtsov ru
 Ivan Konsratevich Kravtsov ru
 Ivan Savelevich Kravtsov ru
 Ilya Kravtsov ru
 Nikolai Kravtsov ru
 Olgerd Kravtsov ru
 Aleksandr Kravchenko ru
 Andrey Grigoryevich Kravchenko (twice)
 Andrey Ilyich Kravchenko ru
 Vasily Ivanovich Kravchenko (1923—1944) ru
 Vasily Ivanovich Kravchenko (1924—1982) ru
 Vasily Fyodorovich Kravchenko ru
 Vladimir Kravchenko ru
 Grigory Kravchenko (twice)
 Ivan Khotovich Kravchenko ru
 Ivan Yakovlevich Kravchenko
 Mikhail Kravchenko ru
 Nikolai Kravchenko ru
 Sergey Kravchenko ru
 Fyodor Iosifovich Kravchenko ru
 Fyodor Tikhonovich Kravchenko ru
 Vladimir Kraev ru
 Nikolai Kraev ru
 Aleksey Kraiko ru
 Nikolai Kraynev ru
 Aleksandr Kraynov ru
 Ivan Kraynov ru
 Stepan Kraynov ru
 Tikhon Kralya ru
 Andrey Kramarenko ru
 Grigory Kramarenko ru
 Sergey Kramarenko
 Grigory Kramarchuk ru
 Stepan Kramar ru
 Ivan Kramchaninov ru
 Nikita Krapiva ru
 Aristarkh Krapivin ru
 Yakov Krapivin ru
 Fyodor Krapivny ru
 Konstantin Krasavin
 Mikhail Krasavin ru
 Semyon Krasy ru
 Aleksandr Krasikov ru
 Ivan Krasikov ru
 Nikolai Krasikov ru
 Aleksandr Krasilov ru
 Aleksey Krasilov ru
 Aleksey Krasilnikov ru
 Gennady Krasilnikov ru
 Ivan Krasilnikov ru
 Nikolai Krasilnikov ru
 Ivan Mikhailovich Krasnik ru
 Ivan Yakovlevich Krasnik ru
 Anatoly Krasnov ru
 Viktor Krasnov ru
 Zosim Krasnov ru
 Ivan Krasnov ru
 Nikolai Ivanovich Krasnov ru
 Nikolai Petrovich Krasnov ru
 Nikolai Fyodorovich Krasnov
 Nikolai Krasnovsky ru
 Aleksey Krasnokutsky ru
 Konstantin Krasnokutsky ru
 Khaim Krasnokutsky ru
 Mitrofan Krasnolutsky ru
 Sergey Krasnopyorov ru
 Ivan Krasnoselsky ru
 Ivan Krasnoyurchenko ru
 Klavdy Krasnoyarov ru
 Aleksandr Krasnukhin ru
 Ivan Krasnyukov ru
 Viktor Krasov ru
 Stepan Krasovsky
 Georgy Krasota ru
 Yevgeny Krasutsky ru
 Semyon Kratinov ru
 Dmitry Kratov ru
 Alekseu Krakhmal ru
 Ivan Krasheninnikov ru
 Igor Kreizer ru
 Yakov Kreizer
 Nikolsi Kremenish ru
 Simon Kremer ru
 Yevgeny Kremlyov ru
 Ilya Kremok ru
 Ernst Krenkel
 Nikolai Kreptsov-Zaichenko ru
 Pyotr Krestyaninov ru
 Tikhon Kretinin ru
 Aleksandr Kretov ru
 Nikolai Kretov ru
 Stepan Kretov (twice)
 Andrey Krechetov ru
 Vasily Krechetov ru
 Ivan Krivenko ru
 Nikolai Krivenko ru
 Semyon Krivenko ru
 Fedosy Krivenko ru
 Pyotr Kriven ru
 Aleksandr Krivets ru
 Nikolai Krivov ru
 Yevgeny Krivoy ru
 Pavel Krivokorytov ru
 Grigoru Krivolapov ru
 Nikolai Krivolutsky ru
 Aleksandr Krivonos ru
 Aleksey Krivonos ru
 Nikolai Krivonos ru
 Pavel Krivonos ru
 Vladimir Krivorotov ru
 Mikhail Krivorotov ru
 Sergey Krivorotchenko ru
 Aleksey Krivoruchenko ru
 Tikhon Krivoukhov ru
 Georgy Krivokhizhin ru
 Arkady Krivoshapkin ru
 Yefim Krivosheyev ru
 Semyon Krivoshein
 Aleksey Krivoshchyokov ru
 Sergey Krivtsov ru
 Sergey Krikalev
 Vasily Kriklivy ru
 Vasily Krikun ru
 Veniamin Krikunenko ru
 Nikolai Krisanov ru
 Ilya Krichevsky ru
 Arsenty Krishtal ru
 Pyotr Krovko ru
 Albert Kronit ru
 Mikhail Kropotov ru
 Boris Krotov ru
 Mikhail Krotov ru
 Fyodor Krotov ru
 Vyacheslav Krott ru
 Vasily Krotyuk ru
 Anatoly Krokhalyov ru
 Nikita Kruglikov ru
 Vasily Kruglov ru
 Leonid Kruglov ru
 Nikolai Kruglov ru
 Pavel Kruglov ru
 Vasily Kruzhalov ru
 Ivan Krumin ru
 Andrey Krupin ru
 Pyotr Krupinov ru
 Viktor Krupsky ru
 Pavel Krupsky ru
 Dmitry Krutikov ru
 Ivan Krutikov ru
 Lavrenty Krutilenko ru
 Pyotr Krutov ru
 Aleksey Krutogolov ru
 Andrey Krutoshinsky ru
 Sevastyan Kruchyonykh ru
 Vladimir Kruchinin ru
 Mikhail Krygin ru
 Vasily Krylov ru
 Nikolai Ivanovich Krylov (twice)
 Nikolai Nikolayevich Krylov (1918—1980) ru
 Nikolai Nikolayevich Krylov (1922—1985) ru
 Pavel Krylov ru
 Fyodor Gavrilovich Krylov ru
 Fyodor Mikhailovich Krylov ru
 Mikhail Krymov ru
 Stepan Krynin ru
 Arseny Krysyuk ru
 Vasily Krushkin ru
 Aleksandr Kryukov ru
 Vasily Kryukov ru
 Vladimir Kryukov
 Ivan Kryukov ru
 Konstantin Kryukov ru
 Nikolai Kryukov ru
 Pavel Kryukov ru
 Pyotr Kryukov ru
 Vladimir Kryuchenko ru
 Abram Kryuchkov ru
 Vasily Kryuchkov ru
 Ivan Kryuchkov ru
 Fyodor Kryuchkov ru
 Vasily Kryazhev ru
 Sergey Kryzhanovsky ru
 Aniela Krzywoń
 Grigory Kzendzov ru
 Aleksandr Kuzmich Ksenofontov ru
 Aleksandr Sergeyevich Ksenofontov ru
 Aleksey Ksynkin ru
 Timiray Kubakaev ru
 Vasily Krbarev ru
 Valery Kubasov
 Alekseu Kublitsky ru
 Pavel Kubyshkin ru
 Georgy Kubyshko ru
 Aleksandr Kuvashev ru
 Leonid Kuversky ru
 Ivan Kuvika ru
 Ivan Kuvin ru
 Aleksandr Kuvshinov ru
 Leonid Kuvshinov ru
 Lev Kudakovsky ru
 Pyotr Kudar ru
 Mikhail Kudachkin ru
 Idris Kudashev ru
 Ivan Kudashkin ru
 Vladimir Kudashov
 Georgy Kudashov ru
 Afanasy Kudersky ru
 Pavel Kudimov ru
 Ivan Kudin ru
 Dmitry Kudinov ru
 Andrey Kudrevtov ru
 Vladimir Kudrin ru
 Dmiry Kudrin ru
 Ivan Kudrin ru
 Roman Kudrin ru
 Ivan Kudrya ru
 Nikolai Kudrya ru
 David Kudyavitsky ru
 Aleksandr Georgievich Kudryavtsev ru
 Aleksandr Sergeyevich Kudryavtsev ru
 Viktor Kudryavtsev ru
 Nikifor Kudryavtsev ru
 Nikolai Kudryavtsev ru
 Sergey Kudryavtsev ru
 Gerasim Kudryashev ru
 Vladimir Kudryashov ru
 Konstantin Kudryashov ru
 Nikolai Kudryashov ru
 Sergey Kudryashov ru
 Murat Kuzhakov ru
 Stepan Kuzakov ru
 Gennady Kuzenko ru
 Ivan Kuzyonov ru
 Aleksandr Grigoryevich Kuzin ru
 Aleksey Kuzin ru
 Ivan Kuzin ru
 Ilya Kuzin ru
 Mikhail Kuzminov ru
 Aleksandr Aleksandrovich Kuznetsov ru
 Aleksandr Alekseyevich Kuznetsov ru
 Aleksandr Mikhailovich Kuznetsov ru
 Aleksandr Nikolayevich Kuznetsov ru
 Aleksey Ivanovich Kuznetsov ru
 Aleksey Kirillovich Kuznetsov ru
 Anatoly Ivanovich Kuznetsov ru
 Anatoly Semyonovich Kuznetsov ru
 Boris Kirillovich Kuznetsov ru
 Boris Lvovich Kuznetsov ru
 Vasily Aleksandrovich Kuznetsov ru
 Vasily Grigorievich Kuznetsov ru
 Vasily Ivanovich Kuznetsov 
 Vasily Mikhailovich Kuznetsov ru
 Viktor Ignatevich Kuznetsov ru
 Viktor Pavlovich Kuznetsov ru
 Viktor Petrovich Kuznetsov ru
 Vladimir Kuznetsov ru
 Georgy Andreyevich Kuznetsov ru
 Georgy Antonovich Kuznetsov ru
 Georgy Stepanovich Kuznetsov ru
 Grigory Dmitrivich Kuznetsov ru
 Girgory Ilyich Kuznetsov ru
 Grigory Matveyevich Kuznetsov ru
 Dmitry Arakadevich Kuznetsov ru
 Dmitry Ignatevich Kuznetsov ru
 Yevgeny Kuznetsov ru
 Ivan Aleksandrovich Kuznetsov ru
 Ivan Alekseyevich Kuznetsov ru
 Ivan Ivanovich Kuznetsov ru
 Ivan Lazarevich Kuznetsov ru
 Ivan Mikhailovich Kuznetsov ru
 Ivan Petrovich Kuznetsov ru
 Ivan Fyodorovich Kuznetsov ru
 Innokenty Kuznetsov ru
 Kirill Kuznetsov ru
 Konstantin Gavrilovich Kuznetsov ru
 Konstantin Grigorievich Kuznetsov ru
 Leonid Kuznetsov ru
 Mikhail Arsentevich Kuznetsov ru
 Mikhail Vasilyevich Kuznetsov
 Mikhail Mikhailovich Kuznetsov ru
 Mikhail Petrovich Kuznetsov ru
 Mikhail Tikhonovich Kuznetsov ru
 Nikolai Aleksandrovich Kuznetsov ru
 Nikolai Alekseyevich Kuznetsov ru
 Nikolai Anatolevich Kuznetsov ru
 Nikolai Vasilyevich Kuznetsov (1912—1993) ru
 Nikolai Vasilyevich Kuznetsov (1921—1945) ru
 Nikolai Gersimovich Kuznetsov
 Nikolai Ivanovich Kuznetsov
 Nikolai Ivanovich Kuznetsov (spy)
 Nikolai Leontevich Kuznetsov ru
 Nikolai Pavlovich Kuznetsov (artilleryman) ru
 Nikolai Pavlovich Kuznetsov (pilot) ru
 Nikolai Fyodorovich Kuznetsov ru
 Pavel Dmitrievich Kuznetsov ru
 Pavel Yefimovich Kuznetsov ru
 Pavel Ivanovich Kuznetsov ru
 Pyotr Grigorievich Kuznetsov ru
 Pyotr Ivanovich Kuznetsov
 Pyotr Nifontovich Kuznetsov ru
 Sergey Alekseyevich Kuznetsov ru
 Sergey Yegorovich Kuznetsov ru
 Sergey Trofimovich Kuznetsov ru
 Stepan Matveyevich Kuznetsov ru
 Stepan Nikiforovich Kuznetsov ru
 Tikhon Kuznetsov ru
 Fyodor Kuznetsov ru
 Eduard Kuznetsov ru
 Yuri Kuznetsov
 Demyan Kuzov ru
 Ivan Kuzovkov ru
 Miron Kuzovlev ru
 Anatoly Kuzovnikov ru
 Pavel Kuzub ru
 Grigory Kuzmenko ru
 Ivan Panteleyevich Kuzmenko ru
 Ivan Prokofevich Kuzmenko ru
 Nikolai Kuzmenko ru
 Anatoly Ivanovich Kuzmin ru
 Anatoly Naumovich Kuzmin ru
 Valentin Kuzmin ru
 Vasily Mikhailovich Kuzmin ru
 Vasily Stepanovich Kuzmin ru
 Vasily Fyodorovich Kuzmin ru
 Viktor Kuzmin ru
 Georgy Kuzmin ru
 Dmitry Kuzmin ru
 Ivan Kuzmin ru
 Ilyich Kuzmin ru
 Matvey Kuzmin
 Mikhail Aleksandrovich Kuzmin ru
 Mikhail Kuzmich Kuzmin ru
 Mikhail Mikhailovich Kuzmin ru
 Nikolai Kuzmin ru
 Sergey Kuzmin ru
 Fyodor Kuzmin ru
 Vasily Kuzminov ru
 Vasily Kuzminov ru
 Ivan Muzminov ru
 Ivan Kuzminykh ru
 Vasily Kuzmichyov ru
 Ivan Kuzmichyov ru
 Gavriil Kuzyakin ru
 Marvey Kuzyakin ru
 Vasily Kuk ru
 Ivan Kukarin ru
 Aleksey Kukin ru
 Arkady Kukin ru
 Roman Kuklev ru
 Leonid Kukolevsky ru
 Pyotr Kuksov ru
 Sergey Kukunin ru
 Viktor Kukushkin ru
 Valentin Kulabukhov ru
 Andrey Kulagin
 Valery Kulakov ru
 Konstantin Kulakov ru
 Nikolai Kulakov
 Pyotr Kulakov ru
 Teodor Kulakov
 Nikolai Kulebyaev ru
 Pavel Kuleykin ru
 Boris Kulemin ru
 Anatoly Kuleshov ru
 Vladimir Ivanovich Kuleshov ru
 Vladimir Kuzmich Kuleshov ru
 Ivan Kuleshov ru
 Konstanin Kuleshov ru
 Pavel Kuleshov ru
 Stepan Kuleshov ru
 Pyotr Kulizhsky ru
 Aleksandr Kulik ru
 Afanasy Kulik ru
 Grigory Ivanovich Kulik
 Grigory Karpovich Kulik ru
 Ilya Kulik ru
 Iosif Kulik ru
 Konstantin Kulik ru
 Tsaezar Kulikov
 Aleksey Kulikov ru
 Vasily Ivanovich Kulikov (1921—1943) ru
 Vasily Ivanovich Kulikov (1923—1991) ru
 Viktor Georgievich Kulikov ru
 Viktor Nikolayevich Kulikov
 Ivan Kulikov ru
 Nikolai Alekseyevich Kulikov ru
 Nikolai Ivanovich Kulikov ru
 Sergey Kulikov ru
 Fyodor Alekseyevich Kulikov ru
 Fyodor Fyodorovich Kulikov ru
 Ivan Kulichev ru
 Yakov Kulishev ru
 Pavel Kulyk ru
 Pyotr Kulbaka ru
 Sidor Kulbashnoy ru
 Aleksey Kulbyakin ru
 Helene Kullman
 Andrey Kulnev ru
 Fyodor Kultin ru
 Nikolai Kulchitsky ru
 Aleksandr Kulyasov ru
 Pavel Kumanyov ru
 Aleksandr Kumanichkin ru
 Viktor Kumskov ru
 Khalmurza Kumukov ru
 Grigoru Kunavin ru
 Yevgeny Kungurtsev (twice)
 Yakov Kunder ru
 Aleksandr Kunets ru
 Zamakhshyari Kunizhev ru
 Tsezar Kunikov
 Aleksey Kunitsa ru
 Semyon Kunitsa ru
 Pyotr Kunitsyn ru
 Izrail Kupershtein ru
 Ivan Kupin ru
 Fyodor Kupin ru
 Aleksey Kupriyanov ru
 Dmitry Kupriyanov ru
 Pavel Kupriyanov ru
 Pyotr Kupriyanov ru
 Semyon Kupriyanov ru
 Smitry Kuptsov ru
 Sergey Kuptsov ru
 Grigory Kupchin ru
 Vladimir Kurakin ru
 Gavrila Kurakin ru
 Nikolai Kurakin ru
 Pyotr Kurasanov ru
 Vasily Kurasov ru
 Vladimir Kurasov
 Vladimir Kurachinsky ru
 Afanasy Kurbaev ru
 Aleksey Kurbanov ru
 Akhmedzhan Kurbanov ru
 Sumen Kurbanov ru
 Vasily Kurbatov ru
 Georgy Kurbatov ru
 Mikhail Kurbatov ru
 IvanAndreyevich Kurgansky ru
 Ivan Danilovich Kurgansky ru
 Yuri Kurguzov ru
 Nikolai Kurdov ru
 Ivan Kurenkov ru
 Aleksandr Kurzenkov ru
 Sergey Kurzenko ru
 Vladimir Kurilenko ru
 Vladimir Ilyich Kurilov ru
 Vladimir Nikonorovich Kurilov ru
 Aleksey Kurin ru
 Lyudvig Kurist ru
 Aleksandr Kurko ru
 Vasily Kurkov ru
 Nikolai Kurkov ru
 Stepan Kurkov ru
 Semyon Kurkotkin
 Yuri Kurlin ru
 Dmitry Kurluk ru
 Vadim Kurmanin ru
 Akan Kurmanov ru
 Sergey Kurnaev ru
 Nikolai Kuroedov ru
 Nikolai Kuropatkin ru
 Dmitry Kuropyatnik ru
 Grigory Kuropyatnikov ru
 Vladimir Kurochkin ru
 Yefim Kurochkin ru
 Pavel Kurochkin
 Timofey Kurochkin ru
 Boris Kurtsev ru
 David Kuryzhov ru
 Ivan Kuryatnik ru
 Nikolai Kuryatnikov ru
 Konstantin Kuryachy ru
 Tagir Kusimov
 Viktor Kuskov ru
 Aleksey Kustov ru
 Viktor Kustov ru
 Ivan Kustov ru
 Igor Kustov ru
 Fyodor Kustov ru
 Pavel Kutakhov (twice)
 Mikhail Kuteynikov ru
 Nikolai Kutenko ru
 Pavel Kutepov ru
 Aleksey Kutin ru
 Ivan Kutinov ru
 Andrey Kutovoy ru
 Konstantin Kutrukhin ru
 Rauf Kutuev ru
 Ivan Kuturga ru
 Nikolai Kutyntsev ru
 Sergey Kufonin ru
 Grigory Kukharev ru
 Ivan Kukharev ru
 Fyodor Kukharev ru
 Nikolai Kukharenko ru
 Konstantin Kukharov ru
 Aleksandr Kuts ru
 Timofey Kutsevalov ru
 Ivan Kutsenko ru
 Aleksandr Kucherenko ru
 Vladimir Kucherenko ru
 Ivan Kucherenko ru
 Nikolai Kucherenko ru
 Pyotr Kucherov ru
 Frants Kucherov ru
 Tikhon Kucheryaba ru
 Mikhail Kucheryavenko ru
 Viktor Kucheryavy ru
 Gerasim Kucheryavy ru
 Nikolai Kucheryany ru
 Mikhail Kuchinsky
 Gennady Kuchkin ru
 Aleksandr Kuchumov ru
 Pavel Kuchumov ru
 Rostislav Kushlyansky ru
 Mikhail Kushnov ru
 Ivan Kushtin ru
 Aleksandr Kushchev ru
 Mikhail Kuyukov ru
 Pyotr Ktsoev ru
 Aleksandr Kshensky ru
 Mikhail Kyrchanov ru
 Fyodor Kytin ru
 Panteley Kyanzhin ru

References 
 
 
 
 Russian Ministry of Defence Database «Подвиг Народа в Великой Отечественной войне 1941—1945 гг.» [Feat of the People in the Great Patriotic War 1941-1945] (in Russian).

Lists of Heroes of the Soviet Union